Batman and Robin Eternal is a 6-month weekly limited series published by DC Comics, that began in October 2015 and concluded in March 2016. The series featured Batman, Robin, and their allies, and was a follow up series to Batman Eternal. Batman and Robin Eternal was written by James Tynion IV, Scott Snyder, Tim Seeley, Steve Orlando, Genevieve Valentine, Jackson Lanzing, Collin Kelly, and Ed Brisson.

Batman Day 8-page preview
In September 2015, DC Comics held another Batman Day celebration, re-releasing Batman #35 as Batman: Endgame Special Edition for free in stores and electronically. This comic contained an 8-page preview of Batman and Robin Eternal written by Tynion and drawn by Tony S. Daniel, announced as the lead artist for the series. The 8-page preview format matched what DC Comics had done at the end of the Convergence event, with 8-page previews giving readers a taste of the new, relaunched, or continuing series coming in June.

In the preview, two timelines converge on the climax of the forthcoming series - Batman hiding a secret on a Bat-flashdrive concerning the villain "Mother" from Dick Grayson many years ago, while Grayson was still Robin, and in the future, a massive worldwide battle between Mother's forces and the Batfamily.

Plot
The series switches between the present, where Dick Grayson and his allies battle the plans of the mysterious Mother, and the past, where Batman and Robin face the Scarecrow for the first time.

Present
Dick Grayson, on assignment for Spyral, teams up with Tim Drake (Red Robin) and Jason Todd (Red Hood) to stop a cyborg cyclist. Later, he is attacked by a group of children and his own field handler, both claiming to act on behalf of someone called "Mother". Running away, he meets a nearly silent young woman who also says one word - "Mother", but instead of attempting to kill him, she deliberately holds back and gives him a Bat-flashdrive containing a confession from Batman, as well as a list of names. The recording identifies the young woman as Cassandra Cain.

Harper Row, bitter that Batman's apparent death at the hand of the Joker has robbed her of the chance to be Batman's partner, suffers an attack by one of Mother's agents calling himself the Orphan. Cassandra Cain saves her, then chases after the Orphan. Dick meets Harper and her roommate Stephanie Brown (the Spoiler), and takes them to the Batcave to get Harper medical attention and meet with Tim and Jason. Dick's superior, Helena Bertinlli, Matron of Spyral, discovers that Mother's agents are going to attack Bruce Wayne at a party.

Dick rushes off to save Bruce, and is met by members of the We Are Robin gang (including Duke Thomas) and Batgirl. They save Bruce from dozens of ax-wielding assassins, and Dick follows a lead while Tim, Jason, and Stephanie deal with the disappearance of an injured Harper and the mysterious Cassandra.

Dick's lead turns out to be Tim's witness-protection-program parents, which causes a split in the Robins - Tim and Jason investigating one lead, Dick another. Dick, Harper, and Cass head to Prague, where they find Mother waiting for them. She entices Dick to join her, but he rejects her offer and instead battles her agents at the ballet alongside Harper and Cass. In the wake of their victory, Harper accidentally triggers something in Cass, who flees.

Jason and Tim follow the electronic signal that coincided with the attack on Bruce and find Bane attempting to take back his former country from the mysterious Order of St. Dumas. Working together with the villain, Jason and Tim stumble upon Azrael, also known as Jean-Paul Valley, apparently another one of Mother's children, sold to the Order as an angel of death against their enemies. Tim suffers the effects of Azrael's mental attack, and Jason carries him away to safety.

Dick and Harper follow the trail of the Orphan to the identity of David Cain, but are surprised to find the Sculptor, Cain's other half in Mother's inner circle. The Sculptor has powerful telepathic powers which Mother uses to shape children traumatized by Cain's violence. Using these powers, the Sculptor shows Harper Cassandra's training, deprived of language so that she must read movement and body cues, and forced to kill a woman in a dark alley. Dick breaks the mind meld when the Sculptor begins showing Harper Batman's meetings and deals with Mother, but the Sculptor only shows Dick her own orphaning and abduction by Mother, as well as a few hints of what Batman did in her service, before she disappears and reveals the entire encounter was her projection.

Based on the Sculptor's warning, Dick and Harper know that Mother is murdering all of her old children, and rush to her training center, the Nursery, where they find Cassandra standing against her father. Inspired by her meeting with Batman, Cassandra paints the Bat on her face with blood as a mask, and together, Dick, Harper, and Cass fight their way past the Orphan to escape from the nuclear self destruction of the base and on to Spyral's headquarters to plan their next moves.

Past
In Dick's first confrontation with a supervillain as Batman's partner, Batman and Robin face Jonathan Crane's students, driven by Scarecrow's fear toxin. Later, they are ambushed by Crane in a cornfield and first exposed to the fear toxin. They follow Scarecrow to a meeting with the Orphan and Cassandra Cain, and discover that the villains are headed to Prague. After a failed attempt to stop Scarecrow's plane, Bruce discovers the existence of a woman known as Mother from a fellow society member, who tells him he purchased his wife made to order by this human trafficker. The man is murdered by the Orphan that night, and Batman keeps the secret from Dick, telling him that they are chasing Scarecrow alone to Prague. After setting up an international Batcave, Batman secretly meets with Mother and Orphan, apparently wanting to replace Dick with a more reliable partner. Batman and Robin conduct an assault on Scarecrow's warehouse, and while Robin disables a bomb on the roof, Batman forces Scarecrow to work for him against Mother. In his ambition, Scarecrow reveals that Mother plans to gas every major city in the world with his newly created "trauma toxin", leaving billions of children ripe for her new process of brainwashing and manipulation.

Premise and characters
At San Diego Comic-Con 2015, Tynion and Snyder announced that Cassandra Cain would return to mainstream continuity in Batman and Robin Eternal, and serve as one of three main characters alongside Dick Grayson and Harper Row (Bluebird).

Collected editions

References

Comics by Scott Snyder
Batman titles
Robin (character) titles